The 2022–23 Georgia Southern Eagles men's basketball team represented Georgia Southern University in the 2022–23 NCAA Division I men's basketball season. The Eagles, led by second-year head coach Brian Burg, played their home games at Hanner Fieldhouse in Statesboro, Georgia as members of the Sun Belt Conference.

Previous season
The Eagles finished the 2020–21 season 13–16, 5–11 in Sun Belt play to finish in 10th place. They defeated Coastal Carolina in the first round of the Sun Belt tournament before losing to Appalachian State in the quarterfinals.

Offseason

Departures

Transfers

Recruiting classes

2022 recruiting class

2023 recruiting class

Preseason

Preseason Sun Belt Conference poll 
The Eagles were picked to finish in 11th place in the conference's preseason poll.

Roster

Schedule and results

|-
!colspan=12 style=| Non-conference regular season

|-
!colspan=12 style=| Sun Belt Conference regular season

|-
!colspan=12 style=| Sun Belt tournament

|-

Source

References

Georgia Southern Eagles men's basketball seasons
Georgia Southern Eagles
Georgia Southern Eagles men's basketball
Georgia Southern Eagles men's basketball